Ann Baskett, actress, (1928-2020), RADA scholar, starred in the 1952 BBC production of Pride and Prejudice by Jane Austen opposite Peter Cushing. This was a 5-part mini-series and was transmitted live, requiring theatre-like timing and TV production techniques which were the most advanced of the time, as the players followed their cues to appear in up to five theatre sets in succession. After having a family, Ann took up painting and has exhibited at the Royal Society of Miniature Painters Sculptors and Gravers. She also worked as a theatre critic using her married name, Ann St Clair-Stannard.

Filmography

External links
Pride and Prejudice productions

Royal Society of Miniature Painters Sculptors and Gravers

Alumni of RADA
British actresses
Living people
Year of birth missing (living people)